Aix-en-Provence railway station is one of two serving the city of Aix-en-Provence in the Bouches-du-Rhône department of southeastern France. The other station, served by long-distance high-speed TGV trains on the LGV Méditerranée line, is Aix-en-Provence TGV, and lies about 12 km southwest of the city centre.

Services

The station is served by regional trains (TER Provence-Alpes-Côte d'Azur) to Marseille, Pertuis, Gap and Briançon.

iDBus
Since 27 May 2013, SNCF's national and international coach network, iDBus, serves Aix-en-Provence station.

Aix-en-Provence - Nice - Genoa - Milan

References

Railway stations in Bouches-du-Rhône
Railway stations in France opened in 1877
TER Provence-Alpes-Côte-d'Azur